In algebraic geometry, an unramified morphism is a morphism  of schemes such that (a) it is locally of finite presentation and (b) for each  and , we have that

A flat unramified morphism is called an étale morphism.

Some authors prefer to use weaker conditions, in which case they call a morphism satisfying the above a G-unramified morphism.

Simple example 
Let  be a ring and B the ring obtained by adjoining an integral element to A; i.e.,  for some monic polynomial F. Then  is unramified if and only if the polynomial F is separable (i.e., it and its derivative generate the unit ideal of ).

Curve case 
Otherwise,  is said to be ramified at P and Q is called a branch point.

Characterization 
Given a morphism  that is locally of finite presentation, the following are equivalent:
 f is unramified.
 The diagonal map  is an open immersion.
 The relative cotangent sheaf  is zero.

See also 
Finite extensions of local fields
Ramification (mathematics)

References 

Algebraic geometry
Morphisms